Bad Großpertholz is a town in the district of Gmünd in the Austrian state of Lower Austria.

Geography
Bad Großpertholz lies in the northwest Waldviertel in Lower Austria on the Czech border. About 76.39 percent of the municipality is forested.

References

External links
Municipal website

Cities and towns in Gmünd District
Spa towns in Austria